José António Mendonça Ferreira, known as Conhé (born 4 July 1945) is a Portuguese football manager and a former player.

He played 14 seasons and 329 games in the Primeira Liga for Fabril Barreiro, Braga, União de Tomar, Portimonense and Sporting.

Club career
He made his Primeira Liga debut for União de Tomar on 8 September 1968 in a game against Atlético CP.

References

External links

1945 births
Living people
People from Moita
Portuguese footballers
U.F.C.I. Tomar players
Primeira Liga players
G.D. Fabril players
Sporting CP footballers
S.C. Braga players
Portimonense S.C. players
Portuguese football managers
S.C. Beira-Mar managers
Vitória F.C. managers
União Montemor managers
Primeira Liga managers
CD Badajoz managers
Portuguese expatriate football managers
Portuguese expatriate sportspeople in Spain
Expatriate football managers in Spain
Association football goalkeepers
Sportspeople from Setúbal District